Oliver Ames may refer to several members of the Massachusetts family:

Oliver Ames Sr. (1779–1863), founder of the Ames Shovel Works
Oliver Ames Jr. (1807–1877), his son, president of Union Pacific Railroad during the completion of the First Transcontinental Railroad in North America
Oliver Ames (governor) (1831–1895), nephew of Oliver Ames, Jr., a U.S. political figure and financier, and 35th Governor of Massachusetts
Oliver Ames High School, Easton Massachusetts

See also
Ames (surname)

Ames, Oliver